Baway Wala is a village in Punjab, Pakistan, near Tapyala. There are three poultry farms in the village and the head of the village is Haji Muhammad Sharif. His son Talib Hussain was also a poultry farmer. Now his sons Mudassar Hussain and Mubashar Hussain are holding his jobs. This village is purely an agricultural village.

References

Villages in Narowal District